The Princeton Tigers women's lacrosse team is an NCAA Division I college lacrosse team representing Princeton University as part of the Ivy League. They play their home games at Class of 1952 Stadium in Princeton, New Jersey.

Historical statistics
*Statistics through 2019 season

Individual career records

Reference:

Individual single-season records

Seasons
References:

Postseason Results

The Tigers have appeared in 28 NCAA tournaments. Their postseason record is 38-24.

References